All India Vaish Federation is an International organization that was established in 1981 to promote the interests of the Vaishya community. Gireesh Kumar Sanghi, Ex Member of Parliament is the National President of AIVF while Indrajyoti Dasgupta is the Vice President.

All India Vaish Federation is having district units in 20 states across India as well its overseas chapters are working in the USA, Canada, Japan, Thailand, and Dubai.

History 

All India Vaish Federation was founded by Banarsi Das Gupta, an Indian parliamentarian and ex-Chief Minister of Haryana, on November 2, 1982. Banarsi Das Gupta was elected President of the newly established AIVF on a unanimous vote.

After Banarsi Das Gupta, Rajni Ranjan Sahu, Ex-Member of the Indian Parliament became the president. At present, Ramdas Agarwal, Ex. M.P. is its President.

Aims of AIVF 

AIVF aims to unite all units of Vaish samaj spared all over India and to bring them on a common platform, to coordinate and connect various institutes and organizations of Vaish samaj, to work for social, political, and economical upliftment of the Vaish Community, and to establish a branch in every district. Additionally, AIVF makes efforts to raise awareness among youths and women about bad traditions to discourage traditions and fundamentalism.

References

External links 
 official website of AIVF
 official website of MPVF

Organizations established in 1981
Social groups of India
1981 establishments in India